The Harvard Law Record is an independent student-edited newspaper based at Harvard Law School. Founded in 1946, it is the oldest law school newspaper in the United States.

Characteristics
The Record, a print and online publication, includes law school news, world and national news, and scholarly articles and op-eds written by Harvard Law School students and professors, as well as outside contributors. It should not be confused with the Harvard Law Review, which is limited to publishing scholarly academic articles exclusively.

Although it is student-run, the Record is owned by the Harvard Law School Record Corporation, an independent non-profit organization funded primarily through donations. It does not receive much funding or substantial support from the law school. The paper operates out of a basement in the Harvard Law School dorms.

The Record is home to fictional law student Fenno, who since the 1950s has satirically chronicled the adventures of an anonymous law student, and has lampooned prominent members of the Harvard Law School community in the process. It also publishes an annual April Fool's Day issue, renowned for its satire.

History
The Record was founded in 1946 by a group of returning World War II veterans who were unhappy with conditions at the School, particularly a lack of student housing.  The three primary founders of the Record were Charles O. Porter, who later served as a U.S. Congressman from Oregon, Charles Sweet, later a judge, and Paul Hellmuth, who became managing partner of the Boston law firm Hale & Dorr (now WilmerHale).

Among the former editors of the Record is Ralph Nader, who published his first article on unsafe conditions in the auto industry entitled, "American Cars: Designed for Death", in the Record in 1958.  The article was later expanded into Nader's seminal work on the subject, Unsafe at Any Speed. After a year in which the Record ceased publishing, Ralph Nader worked with a law student, Michael Shammas, to revive the paper for the 2015-2016 academic year.

In 1959, Nader and co-editor David Binder traveled to Cuba to report on the Cuban Revolution in the Record, which coverage included an exclusive interview with Fidel Castro.

Also in 1959, William H. Rehnquist, then a young Arizona lawyer, wrote an editorial in the Record entitled "The Making of a Supreme Court Justice," in which he criticized the U.S. Senate for not questioning the judicial philosophy of Supreme Court nominees.  The article was later cited by members of the Senate Judiciary Committee when he refused to answer questions during his confirmation hearings.

In April 1971, the New York Times reported that Harvard Law School professors Alan Dershowitz and Paul Freund had quit after picking up the story from the Records April Fool's Day issue.

In the last decade the Record has won several awards from the American Bar Association Law Student Division for outstanding writing, including the 2007 awards for Best Editorial and Best Feature Article. Although the print edition briefly paused circulating in 2012, in 2013 Harvard Law students Sima Atri and Michael Shammas revamped the paper with the guidance of former editor-in-chief Ralph Nader. The newspaper has an active staff of law students and routinely publishes articles by professors and law students around the country. In the 2015-2016 year, with Michael Shammas as editor-in-chief and Lindsay Church as co-editor-in-chief, the paper published stories that were referenced in The New York Times, American Lawyer, Jerusalem Post, The Washington Post, The Wall Street Journal, The Boston Globe, and other national and international news organizations. The paper also won the American Bar Association's 2016 "Best Law School Newspaper" Award.

In addition to its print edition, The Record operates a website. Robert Mahari is currently the editor-in-chief.

Notable editors and contributors

Jacob M. Appel, fiction writer and bioethicist
Derrick Bell, law professor at NYU Law School
Jeremy Blachman, author of the Anonymous Lawyer blog and books
Alexander Boldizar, novelist and art critic
Ruben Bolling, aka Ken Fisher, cartoonist and creator of Tom the Dancing Bug
Alan Dershowitz, law professor and author
Debra Dickerson, author and commentator
Robert Fellmeth, public interest law professor at the University of San Diego Law School
Robert Flanders, Rhode Island Supreme Court Justice
Martin D. Ginsburg, tax law expert at Georgetown University Law School
Philip Heymann, Deputy Attorney General under Bill Clinton and currently professor at Harvard Law
Ricardo Hinojosa, federal district court judge 
D. Brock Hornby, federal district court judge  
Murad Kalam, O. Henry Award winning novelist
Duncan Kennedy, law professor at Harvard Law School and a founder of Critical Legal Studies. 
George N. Leighton, U.S. District Court judge for the Northern District of Illinois
James Alan McPherson, Pulitzer Prize-winning essayist and short story writer
Johanes Maliza, professional soccer player
Jamie Metzl, Executive Vice President of the Asia Society and former State Department official
Patrick Miles Jr., 2010 Michigan congressional candidate
Makau Mutua, former Dean of the University at Buffalo Law School
Ralph Nader, consumer advocate and U.S. presidential candidate
Charles Ogletree, law professor
Barack Obama, President of the United States
Joel Pollak, 2010 Illinois congressional candidate
Charles O. Porter, U.S. Representative from Oregon
Richard Posner, federal circuit court judge and law professor at the University of Chicago
Samantha Power, Pulitzer Prize-winning journalist, and former United States Ambassador to the United Nations 
William Rehnquist, Chief Justice of the United States
Henry Stern, member of the New York City Council and Commissioner of New York City Parks and Recreation
Jerome J. Shestack, former American Bar Association president
James B. Stewart, journalist, Pulitzer Prize-winning author
Kevin Werbach, business and technology expert at the Wharton School

See also
The Harvard Crimson, Harvard's undergraduate newspaper
Harvard Law Review, a student-edited academic journal
The Harvard Lampoon, undergraduate newspaper
 Harvard Association for Law & Business, law school student organization

References

External links
Official website

Harvard Law School
Law Record
Publications established in 1946
Student newspapers published in Massachusetts